Magic Fountain is the second extended play by Australian electronic band Art vs. Science. It was released on 14 July 2010.

The first single, "Magic Fountain", reached number 9 on Triple J's hottest 100 2010 countdown.

Track listing

Charts and certifications

Weekly charts

Year-end charts

Certifications

References 

2010 EPs
Synth-pop EPs
EPs by Australian artists
Art vs. Science albums